The Slade Collection 81-87 is a compilation album by the British rock band Slade, released by RCA/BMG in March 1991. It contains seventeen tracks spanning the band's years with the RCA label from 1981 to 1987, including three live tracks from Slade on Stage. A follow-up album, The Slade Collection Vol. 2, 79-87, was released in 1993.

The album was re-issued in Europe in 1993 by Castle Communications. In 1996, BMG/RCA re-issued it in Europe, with Castle Communications handling the UK release. Another re-issue followed in 1999 from Polydor. In 2007, Salvo released a remastered version of the compilation, along with The Slade Collection Vol. 2, 79-87, as The Collection 79-87.

Critical reception

Stephen Thomas Erlewine of AllMusic wrote: "For casual fans wishing to supplement the storming, sleazy fun of Feel the Noize, The Slade Collection: '81-'87 contains all of the best latter-day tracks the group recorded, including "My Oh My" and "Run Run Away." Even in this condensed state, the material on '81-'87 isn't as compelling as it was between 1970 and 1975, but this compilation is certainly the best way to sample an inconsistent era." Hi-Fi News & Record Review commented: "OK, there are two or three numbers so corny that you'll reach for the sick bag, but other than that, this is fine pop."

Track listing

Personnel
Slade
Noddy Holder – lead vocals, rhythm guitar
Dave Hill – lead guitar, backing vocals
Jim Lea – bass, piano, violin, keyboard, guitar, backing vocals
Don Powell – drums

Production
John Punter - tracks 1, 6-9, 11-12
Slade - tracks 2-4, 10, 13, 15-16
Jim Lea - tracks 5, 14
Roy Thomas Baker - track 17

Other
Paul Robinson - compiler
Wildlife - design

References

1991 compilation albums
Slade compilation albums
RCA Records compilation albums
Polydor Records compilation albums
Castle Communications compilation albums